Butter-Cake Dick's was a Manhattan café in the cellar of the New-York Daily Tribune building in Spruce Street.  It was named after the proprietor, Richard Marshall, who had been a newsman but now sold butter-cakes, also known as sinkers, which were a type of rich biscuit containing a knob of butter.  It was open all night and did good business with newsboys and politicians from the nearby Tammany Hall who would treat journalists to a butter-cake as a form of patronage or bribe. In the 1850s, the price of a butter-cake with a cup of coffee was three cents.

References

Coffeehouses and cafés in the United States